Kamyslybas (Qamystybas) is a large saltwater lake in the Kyzylorda Region, Kazakhstan. It has an area of 176 km2, although the water level in the lake often fluctuates. 

The health of lake Kamyslybas is directly affected by the Aral Sea, which experienced increasing salinization and desiccation as the result of excessive and unsustainable expansion of irrigation that have drained both the Syr Darya and the Amu Darya, the other major tributary river, and seriously damaged their deltas. Similarly to attempts to rehabilitate and preserve the lower Amu Darya delta, efforts are also underway to improve lakes such as Kamyslybas and Tushchibas.

Geography
It has a maximum depth of 10 meters with a coastline 116 km long at an elevation of 58 meters above sea level. It is the largest body of water in the Kamyslybas lake system. It lies in the northern part of Syr Darya's delta, to which it is connected by a canal, and the water level in the lake is affected by fluctuations on the quantity of water from the Syr-Darya. Its salinity can fluctuate significantly, sometimes reaching the point of becoming brine.

Fauna
Since the 1960s the lake has been well-known for its rich and diverse stocks of fish and wetland species, including carp, pike, catfish, perch, and waterfowl such as ducks, geese, and sandpipers. In 1977, water was pumped into the lake from the Syr-Darya to maintain a sufficient water depth, which also helped maintain the average fishing catches and the aquaculture industry around the lake. Lake Kamyslybas is used as a fishery.

References

External links

Lakes of Kazakhstan
Saline lakes of Asia
Endorheic lakes of Asia